KDNT (94.5 FM) is a terrestrial American radio station, licensed to Oakwood, Texas, United States, and is owned by the North Texas Radio Group, L.P.

The station is currently on the air broadcasting a Top 40 (CHR)/Modern adult contemporary format. The KDNT signal is extremely compact, barely covering the small town of Oakwood, and operating with a coverage area less than some L1 (low power FM) facilities.

History
KDNT was initially proposed by Tomlinson-Leis Communications, L.P. through a short form application filed with the Federal Communications Commission and granted on November 6, 2015. The facility's transmission site was constructed near Broad Street in the small town of Oakwood, giving the community its first licensed aural service.

Tomlinson-Leis Communications sold the construction permit for the facility to North Texas Radio Group, L.P. on January 23, 2018.

The initial call sign KETW was granted on September 27, 2018. The facility is licensed to operate at an ERP of 100 watts, from an elevation of  height above average terrain.

KETW signed on the air October 10, 2018, and received an initial License to Cover from the Federal Communications Commission on October 18, 2018.

North Texas Radio Group, LP was granted a call sign change to the current KDNT on March 3, 2020. Historically, the KDNT call sign was located on AM 1440 (now KEXB) in Denton, Texas from 1938 to 1994.

References

External links

DNT
Modern adult contemporary radio stations
Contemporary hit radio stations in the United States
Radio stations established in 2018
2018 establishments in Texas